Maulvi Ahmadullah Muttaqi  is an Afghan Taliban politician who is currently serving as Deputy Minister of Public and Strategic Relations. He has also served as acting director of information and culture for Kandahar and multimedia branch chief of the cultural commission.

References

Living people
Taliban government ministers of Afghanistan
Year of birth missing (living people)